Enrique Forero González (born December 7, 1942 in Bogota, Colombia) is a botanist.

Authority abbreviation

References

1942 births
Living people
20th-century Colombian botanists
People from Bogotá